The Lime Kilns of Lincoln, Rhode Island, are the remnants of three colonial-era lime kilns, all that is left of one of the oldest lime processing operations in North America. They are located respectively off Louisquisset Pike, Sherman and Dexter Rock Roads in an area that has been known for its lime processing since the 17th century. When originally built, they were roughly cylindrical structures fashioned out of unmortared rubble stone. The second kiln remains are located to the south of Sherman Avenue, near its junction with Louisquisset Pike (approximately ). The third kiln, of which only a partial wall remains standing, is located on the south side of Dexter Rock Road (approximately ).

The kilns were listed on the National Register of Historic Places in 1984.

See also
National Register of Historic Places listings in Providence County, Rhode Island

References

Industrial buildings completed in 1750
Industrial buildings and structures on the National Register of Historic Places in Rhode Island
Lime kilns in the United States
Buildings and structures in Lincoln, Rhode Island
National Register of Historic Places in Providence County, Rhode Island